René Garrec (born 24 December 1934) is a former member of the Senate of France, and was representing the Calvados department as a member of The Republicans.

References
Page on the Senate website

1934 births
Living people
French people of Breton descent
Politicians from Normandy
Rally for the Republic politicians
Union for a Popular Movement politicians
French Senators of the Fifth Republic
University of Caen Normandy alumni
Academic staff of the University of Caen Normandy
Senators of Calvados (department)